Varensell Abbey is a monastic community of Benedictine nuns, located near Rietberg in the district of Gütersloh in North Rhine-Westphalia, Germany.

The monastery was founded in 1902 by the Benedictine Sisters of Perpetual Adoration within the Benedictine Confederation. Later, however, the community developed a way of life more in keeping with that of the Beuronese Congregation, which it joined in 1982. Varensell was given the status of abbey in 1948.

Besides the traditional duties of hospitality, the nuns are occupied in theological work and various handicrafts.

References

External links
Freiraumplanung Wolf - Kloster Varensell - architect's portfolio

20th-century Christian monasteries
1902 establishments in Germany
Monasteries in North Rhine-Westphalia
Christian organizations established in 1902
Benedictine nunneries in Germany
Buildings and structures in Gütersloh (district)